Juan Torres Odelín (born 12 February 1960) is a Cuban former amateur boxer who competed as a light flyweight and won the World Amateur Championships at Reno in 1986.

A five-time national champion, he was a gold medalist at the Friendship Games and won a bronze medal at the 1987 Pan American Games.

References

1960 births
Living people
Cuban male boxers
Light-flyweight boxers
AIBA World Boxing Championships medalists
Pan American Games medalists in boxing
Pan American Games bronze medalists for Cuba
Boxers at the 1987 Pan American Games
Sportspeople from Santiago de Cuba
Medalists at the 1987 Pan American Games
20th-century Cuban people